Denis Victor Black (20 October 1897 – 21 July 1973) was a British track and field athlete who competed in the 1920 Summer Olympics. In 1920 he was a member of the British relay team which finish fourth in the 4x100 metre relay event. He was born in Aylsham, Norfolk.

References

External links
profile

1897 births
Year of death missing
Olympic athletes of Great Britain
Athletes (track and field) at the 1920 Summer Olympics
People from Aylsham
British male sprinters
English male sprinters